Sinapriculus was an extinct genus of even-toed ungulates that existed in China during the Miocene.

References

Prehistoric Suidae
Fossil taxa described in 2002
Miocene even-toed ungulates
Miocene mammals of Asia
Prehistoric even-toed ungulate genera